Gerardus Johannes Henri (Gert-Jan) Dröge (23 April 1943, in Enschede – 5 June 2007, in Amsterdam) was a Dutch television presenter, producer, actor, journalist and writer who mainly became known for his society programme Glamourland on AVRO television. He was noted for his satirical approach on the show.

In the 1980s he managed the discotheque Richter in Amsterdam, which became nationally known as the location of RUR, the first late night talk show on Dutch television.

He died from lung cancer and was buried at Zorgvlied cemetery.

References

1943 births
2007 deaths
Deaths from lung cancer in the Netherlands
Dutch television presenters
Dutch LGBT actors
LGBT television producers
People from Enschede
20th-century Dutch LGBT people